Emilia Francis Strong (2 September 1840, Ilfracombe, Devon – 23 October 1904), better known as Lady Dilke, was a British author, art historian, feminist and trade unionist.

Biography
Emilia Francis Strong, the daughter of Henry and Emily Weedon Strong, was called by her middle name, with its masculine spelling, during her childhood and youth. She was raised in Iffley, near Oxford, and attended the South Kensington Art School in London in her late teens. 

She married Mark Pattison, Rector of Lincoln College, Oxford, in 1861; she was then known as Francis Pattison, Mrs. Mark Pattison, or, in some of her publications, as  E. F. S. Pattison. 

After Mark Pattison's death in 1884, she married Sir Charles Dilke, and was subsequently known as Lady Dilke or Emilia Dilke.  Both of her marriages were topics of some public discussion.

She became a contributor to the Saturday Review in 1864 and subsequently was for many years fine-art critic of the Academy and from 1873 its art editor, and she published in numerous other journals in Britain and France.   

In addition to numerous signed and unsigned essays, and her major works of art history, she wrote essays on French politics and on women's trade unionism and women's work. She also published two volumes of supernatural short stories (a third part-volume appeared posthumously).  

She was involved with the Women's Protective and Provident League, later the Women's Trade Union League (WTUL), from near its inception in 1874 and she served as President of the WTUL for many years until her death.   

Her niece, Gertrude Tuckwell (daughter of her sister Rosa and brother-in-law the Reverend William Tuckwell) worked with her closely in her feminist and trade unionist activities, later becoming the first woman magistrate in London in 1919.

Works

In addition to numerous articles in periodicals, she published, under the surname Pattison: 
 The Renaissance of Art in France, 2 vols. (London, 1879)
 "Sir Frederic Leighton, P.R.A.".  In Illustrated Biographies of Modern Artists, e.d. Francois G. Dumas (Paris, 1882).
 Claude Lorrain, sa vie and ses oeuvres (Paris, 1884)

Under the surname Dilke, she published the following books: 
 Art in the Modern State (London, 1888)
 French Painters of the Eighteenth Century (London, 1899)
 French Architects and Sculptors of the Eighteenth Century (London, 1900)
 French Engravers and Draftsmen of the XVIIIth Century (London, 1902)
 French Furniture and Decoration in the Eighteenth Century (1901)
 The Shrine of Death and Other Stories (London,1886)
 The Shrine of Love and Other Stories (London, 1891)
 The Book of the Spiritual Life, with a memoir of the author (1905) Stories and essays; memoir by Charles Dilke.
 The Outcast Spirit and Other Stories (Snuggly Books, 2016) Contains most of her fiction.

Further reading
Betty Askwith, Lady Dilke: A Biography (London: Chatto and Windus, 1968) 
Charles Dilke, "Memoir" of the author in Emilia Dilke, The Book of the Spiritual Life (1905)
Kali Israel, Names and Stories: Emilia Dilke and Victorian Culture (New York: OUP, 1999) 
Hilary Fraser, "Emilia Dilke," in Oxford Dictionary of National Biography, ed. H. C. G. Matthew and Brian Harrison (Oxford: OUP, 2004)
Elizabeth Mansfield, "Articulating Authority: Emilia Dilke’s Early Essays and  Reviews," Victorian Periodicals Review 31: 1 (Spring 1998): 76-86

References

External links

 Lady Emilia Dilke
 
 
 
 
 

English journalists
English art historians
English feminists
English horror writers
English trade unionists
People from Ilfracombe
1840 births
1904 deaths
Women horror writers
Women art historians
Wives of baronets
English women trade unionists
19th-century English writers
19th-century British women writers
19th-century British writers
20th-century English writers
20th-century British women writers
British women historians